Dovey may refer to:

 Dovey (surname), a surname
 River Dovey, a river in Wales that forms the border between the counties of Merionethshire and Cardiganshire, United Kingdom
 Dovey Johnson Roundtree (1914-2018), American lawyer